The Global Livability Ranking is a yearly assessment published by the Economist Intelligence Unit (EIU), ranking 172 global cities (previously 140) for their urban quality of life based on assessments of stability, healthcare, culture and environment, education and infrastructure. Austria's capital, Vienna, was ranked the most liveable city in 2022 among the 172 cities surveyed by The Economist Intelligence Unit, having previously won in 2018 and 2019.
 Auckland was ranked the most liveable city in 2021. Melbourne, Australia, had been ranked by the EIU as the world's most liveable city for seven years in a row, from 2011 to 2017.

The Syrian capital, Damascus, was ranked the least liveable city of the 140 assessed in 2018 and 2019, reflecting the ongoing conflict in the country.

Before 2011, Vancouver, Canada, was ranked the EIU's most liveable city from 2002 to 2010. In 2011 the EIU stated that a highway closure on Vancouver Island (separated from Vancouver by the Strait of Georgia and not connected by a bridge) resulted in the "small adjustment" to Vancouver's rating, suggesting a possible error in the 2011 rankings.

Cities from Australia, Canada, western Europe and New Zealand typically dominate the top 10, reflecting their widespread availability of goods and services, low personal risk, and an effective infrastructure. A 2010 opinion piece in The New York Times criticized the Economist Intelligence Unit for being overly Anglocentric, stating that: "The Economist equates liveability with speaking English."

The EIU also publishes a Worldwide Cost of Living Survey that compares the cost of living in a range of global cities.

2022 results 

Top 10 cities of the 2022 ranking.

2021 results 

Top 10 cities of the 2021 ranking.

2019 results 

Top 10 cities of the 2019 ranking

2018 results 

Top 10 cities of the 2018 ranking

2017 results
Top 10 of the 2017 ranking:

2016 results
Top 10 of the 2016 ranking:

2015 results
Top 10 of the 2015 ranking:

See also
 Where-to-be-born Index

References

External links 
 

International quality of life rankings
Economist Intelligence Unit